Vasili Alekseyevich Igumnov (born 27 May 1987) is a former Russian professional football player.

Club career
He played in the Russian Football National League for FC Chernomorets Novorossiysk in 2009.

External links
 
 

1987 births
Living people
Russian footballers
Association football defenders
FC Energiya Volzhsky players
FC Chernomorets Novorossiysk players
FC Sakhalin Yuzhno-Sakhalinsk players